Corinne Maury is a French lecturer in film studies as well as a film director.

Career 
Maury defended her doctoral thesis Habiter le monde : figures poétiques dans le cinéma du réel at the University of Paris III: Sorbonne Nouvelle in 2008.

Since 2009, she has been a teacher-researcher at the University of Toulouse-Jean Jaurès. In 2008-2009 she taught at the Sorbonne Nouvelle University - Paris 3 and from 2005 to 2008 at the University of Paris-Est Marne-la-Vallée.
She is also an associate researcher with the IRCAV – Paris III Sorbonne Nouvelle.
 
Her research focuses mainly on contemporary cinema, the relationship between literature and cinema, the forms of everyday life in cinema and the aesthetics of images.

She has directed several documentary essays.

She co-edited a collective book on the Hungarian filmmaker Béla Tarr.

Publications

General books

Scientific editions 
 2016:  Béla Tarr. De la colère au tourment, under the direction of Corinne Maury and Sylvie Rollet, Crisnée, Editions Yellow Now, Series "Côté Cinéma", 166 pages, 2016 
 2016: Filmer les frontières, under the direction of Corinne Maury and Philippe Ragel, Saint-Denis, Presses Universitaires de Vincennes, series "Esthétiques hors cadre", 208 pages, 2016<ref>Joel Hubrecht, Corinne Maury and Philippe Ragel, Filmer les frontières, Esprit, July–August 2016, </ref>
 2022 : Lav Diaz : faire face, under the direction of Corinne Maury and Olivier Zuchuat , Paris, Post Editions, 365 p.

 Films 
 2001: Mah Damba, une griotte en exil, documentary about the griot Mah Damba, co-directed with Olivier Zuchuat (57 min)..
 2000: André de Richaud, l'homme abreuvoir, (experimental video, Super 8 and 16mm - 6 min) 
 1999: Le Saigneur de la Rivière du Haut, (documentary essay – video 13 min.)
 1998: Gira Amahoro '', (documentary essay, video, 13 min.)

References

External links 
 Corinne Maury on Academia
 

1968 births
Living people
French women film directors